Coburg is a suburb in Melbourne, Victoria, Australia,  north of Melbourne's Central Business District, located within the Cities of Darebin and Merri-bek local government areas. Coburg recorded a population of 26,574 at the 2021 census.

Although most of Coburg is within the City of Merri-bek, a handful of properties on Elizabeth Street, Coburg's eastern boundary, are located in the City of Darebin.

Coburg's boundaries are Gaffney Street and Murray Road in the north, Elizabeth Street and Merri Creek in the east, Moreland Road in the South and Melville Road, Devon Avenue, Sussex Street and West Street in the west. Coburg is designated one of 26 Principal Activity Centres in the Melbourne 2030 Metropolitan Strategy.

History

Prior to European settlement, the area around Coburg and Merri Creek was occupied by the Woiwurrung speaking Wurundjeri people of the Kulin Nation. The Wurundjeri had a religious relationship to their land, participating in corroborees and sacred ceremonies on Merri Creek.

Coburg was first surveyed by Robert Hoddle in 1837 – 1838, and he recorded that a Mr Hyatt had a sheep station and hut on the east bank of the Merri Creek, near present Outlook Road. Hoddle marked out a 327-acre (1.3 km2) village reserve with two roads for the district: Bell Street West and Pentridge Road, later called Sydney Road. In 1840, the village was named Pentridge by a surveyor called Henry Foot, who lived and worked near Merri Creek. It was named after the birthplace of Foot's wife: Pentridge, Dorset, England.

Dr Farquhar McCrae, a wealthy surgeon, purchased 600 acres (2.4 km2) in the area which he called Moreland. In 1841, he also bought land called 'La Rose' in what is now known as Pascoe Vale South. The house he built in 1842 or 1843 is now known as Wentworth House, and is the oldest known private dwelling in Victoria still standing on its original site and the fifth oldest building in Victoria.

In 1842, the first inn, The Golden Fleece, was built on Sydney Road just north of Page Street. Twenty one farms were in the area by 1849. With the Victorian gold rush in the 1850s, the population of the area grew rapidly. In 1858, water mains from Yan Yean were connected and the first local paper, the Brunswick and Pentridge Press, was started. In 1859, the Pentridge District Road Board was formed to get roads built in the area, the start of local government for the area.

Quarrying of bluestone began in the area 1850s, and by 1875 there were 41 quarries in Coburg. In December 1850, 16 prisoners were moved from an overcrowded Melbourne Gaol to a stockade at Pentridge. Prisoners at what came to be called HM Prison Pentridge were immediately put on "hard labour" by breaking up bluestone for road surfaces. In 1867, a public meeting was called to change the name of the district, as residents were stigmatised and embarrassed at living in a suburb principally known for its gaol, Pentridge Prison. Robert Mailer of Glencairn suggested that the suburb name be changed to Coburg, inspired by the impending visit to the colony of the Duke of Edinburgh, who was a member of the royal house of Saxe-Coburg and Gotha. The government agreed with the proposal and the change was made in March 1870.

The Post Office opened on 1 August 1853, and the district was renamed Coburg in January 1870.

Sydney Road attracted numerous hotels and commercial premises in the 1860s. Friendly societies soon formed: Manchester Unity (1863), Druids (1867), Rechabites (1868) and a St. Patrick's Society in (1870). Coburg later became a Shire in 1875.

The Upfield railway line opened in 1884, and the Coburg railway station was built in 1888. In February 1889, the horse tram service began along Sydney Road. Electric trams started in service in 1916.

By 1899, there were 6000 people in the district. Coburg was gazetted as a borough in 1905, with Thomas Greenwood becoming Coburg's first mayor. The Public Hall, built in 1869, was extended in 1909, but was still inadequate for the growing city. The new Town Hall was built and opened in 1923, with further extensions in 1928.

Lake Reserve is a popular picnic spot on the Merri Creek. The land was purchased in 1912, and a weir was constructed in 1915, to form a lake contained by basaltic outcroppings. The reserve was immensely popular, with diving boards, wading pools, kiosk and gardens, and continues to be a favourite picnic spot, also accessed by the Merri Creek Trail.

After World War I, there was significant development east of Sydney Road, with the former East Coburg Primary School opening in 1926, and a Coburg East Post Office opening in 1929 (closing in 1975).

A Coburg West Post Office opened in 1936 and closed in 1979.

The Coburg Magistrates' Court closed on 1 February 1985.

Coburg High School was closed in 1996 by Jeff Kennett, then Premier of Victoria. The site has been sold numerous times yet still sits empty. After considerable community activity, initially opposed by the Bracks Labor Government, in 2012 the then Liberal State Government reopened Coburg High School on the site of the previously closed Moreland High. It is now a thriving 7-12 High School.

In June 1994, the 72-year-old City of Coburg ceased to exist when it merged with the City of Brunswick to become the new City of Moreland.

Population

67.1% of people were born in Australia. The next most common countries of birth were Italy 4.4%, Greece 2.6%, England 2.3%, Lebanon 2.2% and Nepal 1.9%. 65.3% of people spoke only English at home. Other languages spoken at home included Italian 6.8% , Greek 5.5%, Arabic 5.3%, Mandarin 2.0% and Nepali 1.9%. 

The most common responses for religion in Coburg were No Religion 46.8%, Catholic 22.6% and Eastern Orthodox 8.1%.

Culture

The cultural diversity of Coburg is reflected in many ways – through its local street and music festivals, variety of cafes, bakeries, restaurants and grocery shops stocking ingredients from around the world.

Commerce

The main commercial activity in Coburg is the precinct between Coburg railway station and Sydney Road. Coburg doesn't have an enclosed shopping mall, though it does have four shopping arcades on the west side of Sydney Road. Coburg's main commercial precinct comprises about 250 shops, a small indoor market, several supermarkets such as Coles and Woolworths and discount stores such as Dimmeys, arranged around large, ground level car parks. In the 1990s, the Victoria Street pedestrian mall was revamped with native trees and bluestone paving and has become an extremely popular place for locals to congregate, enjoying the local cafes. While Coburg Shopping Centre is very busy during the day, its modest number of restaurants, cafes and bars means that it can be quiet in the evenings. The commercial strip of Sydney Road is continuous from Coburg's southern neighbour Brunswick, but it has a very different character, having so far remained ungentrified.

Transport

Bus
Ten bus routes service Coburg:

 : Essendon station – Ivanhoe station via Brunswick, Northcote and Thornbury. Operated by Moreland Buslines.
 : Strathmore station – East Coburg via Pascoe Vale South, Coburg West and Coburg. Operated by Moreland Buslines.
 : Eltham station – Glenroy station via Lower Plenty. Operated by Dysons.
 : Eltham station – Glenroy station via Greensborough. Operated by Dysons.
 : Coburg – Reservoir via Elizabeth Street. Operated by Ventura Bus Lines.
 : Gowrie station – Northland Shopping Centre via Murray Road. Operated by Ventura Bus Lines.
 : Campbellfield Plaza Shopping Centre – Coburg via Fawkner. Operated by Broadmeadows Bus Service.
 : Glenroy station – Coburg via Boundary Road and Sydney Road. Operated by Dysons.
 : Macleod – Pascoe Vale station via La Trobe University. Operated by Dysons.
  : Altona station – Mordialloc. Operated by Kinetic Melbourne.

Cycling
Cyclists have access to many on-road bike lanes as well as the Upfield Bike Path and the Merri Creek Trail.

Train
The stations of Moreland and Coburg service the south of Coburg, while Batman and Merlynston service Coburg North. These stations are all located on the Upfield railway line.

Tram
Three tram lines service Coburg: 
  travels along Sydney Road from the terminus at Bakers Road, North Coburg to Flinders Street station in the city. While the scheduled service is 6–15 minutes apart, it is frequently late due traffic congestion on Sydney Road.
  travels from the terminus at Bell Street, Coburg, along Nicholson Street, then Lygon Street Brunswick East, Swanston Street past Flinders Street station to South Melbourne Beach.
  travels from the tram depot on Moreland Road, joining the number 1 route at the intersection of Moreland Road and Nicholson Street. While the number 1 turns to South Melbourne at the Arts Centre, route 6 continues along St Kilda Road to Glen Iris.
  from Toorak serves the western part of Coburg via Melville Road, terminating at Bell Street.

Educational facilities

Coburg has a variety of primary and secondary educational facilities. There is a special developmental school, four government primary schools (Coburg North PS, Coburg PS, Coburg West PS, Moreland PS), three Catholic primary schools and a Maronite Christian primary school. Australian International Academy (previously known as King Khalid Islamic College) is a private Islamic school providing primary and secondary education. Following a sustained local campaign, Coburg High School was reestablished in 2015 catering for years 7 to 12. There are other schools, including the Antonine College secondary school campus (7–12), and Mercy College for girls.

Sport

The suburb is home to the Coburg Lions Australian rules football club in the Victorian Football League; the suburb also is home to two Essendon District Football League clubs – West Coburg FC and Northern Saints FC. Coburg also has basketball, cricket, tennis, baseball, swimming, table tennis, track cycling and soccer clubs. One of the oldest sporting clubs in the area is the Coburg Harriers Athletic Club, which has been established for over 100 years.

Landmarks and notable places

Major features of the area include the Sydney Road commercial area, the Merri-bek City Council civic centre precinct on Bell Street including the Coburg City Hall, La Rose house (Victoria's oldest known private dwelling), the John Fawkner Hospital on Moreland Road, and Lake Reserve on Merri Creek. The suburb's most famous landmark is HM Prison Pentridge, which has recently been redeveloped into a housing estate. Land prices have risen considerably since 2001, with The Grove long regarded the most prestigious street in the suburb.

Heritage places
{
  "type": "ExternalData",
  "service": "geomask",
  "ids": "Q647356"
}

Coburg has a number of places of heritage significance listed on the Victorian Heritage Register:

 Murray Road Coburg and Urquhart Street Coburg
 H2042	Baby Health Care Centre, Elm Grove Coburg
 H0689	Cottage, 82 Bell Street Coburg
 1 Booth Street Coburg
 H1198	Bridge Over Merri Creek, Murray Road Coburg
 H1709	Infant Building And Shelter Shed, Primary School No.484, 484 Bell Street Coburg
 H1297	The Grange, 39 Belgrave Street Coburg
 H0959	Holy Trinity Anglican Church Complex, 520 Sydney Road Coburg
 Bush Reserve, 227A Bell Street Coburg
 H0375	Glencairn, 6 Craigrossie Avenue And 3 Wattle Grove Coburg
 H1948	Arundel, 42 Ross Street Coburg
 H1290	Former Bates Building, 400–404 Sydney Road Coburg
 H0962	Uniting Church Second Wesleyan Methodist Chapel, 512 Sydney Road And Corner Bell Street Coburg
 H1446	Bridge, Newlands Road (Over Merri Creek) Coburg
 H1551	Hm Prison Pentridge, Sydney Road And Champ Street And Murray Road And Urquhart Street Coburg
 H0952	Upfield Railway Line Precinct, Brunswick, Parkville And Coburg
 H0139	The American Cottage, 21 Station Street Coburg

Coburg also has a number of places protected by Heritage Overlay controls in the Merri-bek planning scheme.

Notable people
 Vasili Kanidiadis – Host of Vasili's Garden
 Peter Norman
 Raelene Boyle
 Gerald Murnane
 Ted Egan
 Phil Cleary
 Sydney Lucas (1900–2008) – English Australian, one of the three surviving Tommies of World War I
 Rod Quantock
 Dean Jones
 Angry Anderson
 Jock McHale
 Herbert Nelson Davis (1899–1963) – Born 21 April 1899 in Coburg. He was the sixth child of William Bulmer Davis and his wife Letita Ellen. Attended St. Paul's Cathedral school. Davis was famous for his work in the music field as an organist, choirmaster and conductor.
 Bruce White (1916–1984) – Born 3 November 1916 in Coburg. He was the second child of his father Bruce Hellyar White and his wife Blanche Mabel. Attended St. Kevin's College. White enlisted in 1942 in the Royal Air Force, qualifying as a navigator.

See also
 City of Coburg – Coburg was previously within this former local government area.

References

 Richard Broome, Coburg: Between two creeks, Melbourne, 1987
 Laurie Burchell (ed), Coburg Chronicles, Coburg, 1998

External links

 History of Moreland Fact Sheet 3 – Coburg and Pascoe Vale
 Pentridge Village Housing Development
 Australian Places (Monash University)
 Coburg Harriers Club Website

Suburbs of Melbourne
Suburbs of the City of Merri-bek
Suburbs of the City of Darebin